In Greek mythology, Erinoma or Erinona is a beautiful maiden who attracted the attention of both Zeus and Adonis, as well as the wrath of Hera and Aphrodite. Her story seems to be a local variant of Adonis's myth originating from the island of Cyprus, and survives only in the late works of Servius, a Latin grammarian who lived during the early fifth century AD.

Family 
Erinoma was the daughter of a man named Celes, the son of either Ion or Epiuotasterius, two men who arrived to Cyprus from nearby Egypt.

Mythology 
According to the most common versions, Adonis was the son of Cinyras or Theias by his own daughter Myrrha or Smyrna, who tricked her father into bedding her in secret. She then ran away once discovered, and transformed into a myrrh tree, causing her infant son, Adonis to be born some months later from the tree trunk. Adonis was greatly loved by Aphrodite, although he was also made to divide his year between her and Persephone. When he was out hunting one day, he was mortally wounded by a boar. In some versions, that boar was Ares, or Apollo, or perhaps it sent by Artemis as revenge against the goddess of love. Aphrodite greatly mourned her beloved and transformed his blood into a red anemone.

In what appears to be a localized version in Cyprus however, Erinoma was a Cypriot girl of great beauty and chastity. The virgin goddesses Artemis and Athena both favoured her for her purity, but Aphrodite on the other hand disliked her, and she made Zeus fall in love with her, so that she would not escape from the domain of love. But Zeus's wife Hera was not too pleased about the prospect of her husband cheating on her again, so she bid Aphrodite to make Adonis fall in love with Erinoma as well. Adonis failed to win the girl's affections, so Aphrodite wrapped him in a cloud so he could gain access to Erinoma's bedroom with ease. There he found her and he raped her. Artemis then turned Erinoma into a peahen.

Zeus, however,  was enraged upon finding out what had happened to his beloved, so Adonis fled to Mount Cassius for safety. It was Hermes who lured him out of his hiding with the help of a boar (which was Ares in disguise). Once in the open, Zeus struck Adonis with a lightning bolt, killing him. Aphrodite complained about the murder and greatly lamented Adonis's passing. Hermes then brought back Adonis's shade to his people, but he was only fully restored to life by Zeus when Hera requested so. Artemis, meanwhile, restored the peahen Erinoma back to her human form, who then gave birth to Adonis' son Taleus.

Legacy 
Erinome, also known as Jupiter XXV, a retrograde irregular satellite of the planet Jupiter, was named after this Erinoma.

See also 

 Rhodopis and Euthynicus
 Melus
 Argus Panoptes

Notes

References

Bibliography 
 
 
 
 Maurus Servius Honoratus. In Vergilii carmina comentarii. Servii Grammatici qui feruntur in Vergilii carmina commentarii; recensuerunt Georgius Thilo et Hermannus Hagen. Georgius Thilo. Leipzig. B. G. Teubner. 1881.

Women in Greek mythology
Deeds of Artemis
Deeds of Aphrodite
Deeds of Ares
Deeds of Hermes
Deeds of Hera
Deeds of Zeus
Mythological rape victims
Deeds of Athena
Metamorphoses into birds in Greek mythology
Mortal women of Zeus
Cypriot mythology